Katimassou is a village in eastern Ivory Coast. It is in the sub-prefecture of Ettrokro, Daoukro Department, Iffou Region, Lacs District. Four kilometres east of the village is the tripoint of Lacs, Zanzan, and Comoé Districts.

Katimassou was a commune until March 2012, when it became one of 1126 communes nationwide that were abolished.

Notes

Former communes of Ivory Coast
Populated places in Lacs District
Populated places in Iffou